Cattleya luteola is a species of orchid, native to the lowland Amazon rainforest. It is present in Ecuador, Peru, Brazil and Bolivia.

References

External links 
 
 

luteola
Flora of Bolivia
Flora of Ecuador
Flora of Peru
Flora of Brazil